The 2015–16 Villanova Wildcats men's basketball team represented Villanova University in the 2015–16 NCAA Division I men's basketball season. Led by the school's 8th head coach Jay Wright in his 15th year, the Wildcats were members of the Big East Conference and played most of their home games at The Pavilion, with some select home games at the Wells Fargo Center. The Wildcats finished the season with a record of 35–5, 16–2 to win the Big East regular season. They lost in the championship of the Big East tournament to Seton Hall. The Wildcats earned an at-large bid to the NCAA tournament as a No. 2 seed. In the Tournament, they defeated UNC Asheville, Iowa, Miami, and overall #1 seed Kansas to earn a trip to the Final Four, the fifth in school history (although the 1971 Final Four season was vacated by the NCAA). In the Final Four, the Wildcats routed No. 2 seed Oklahoma by the largest margin in Final Four history to face No. 1 seeded North Carolina for the national championship. Led by Final Four MOP, Ryan Arcidiacono, the Wildcats won the National Championship on a three-point shot by Kris Jenkins, assisted by Arcidiacano, as time expired. The Wildcats won the school's second national title, having previously won the 1985 NCAA tournament.

Their 35 wins were the most in school history, breaking a record of 33 wins set the previous season. In beating No. 3 seed Miami (AP No. 10), No. 1 seed Kansas (AP No. 1), No. 2 seed Oklahoma (AP No. 7) and No. 1 seed UNC (AP No. 3), Villanova became the first school in 31 years — since the 1985 Villanova Wildcats — to not only beat four top-three seeds on the way to a national title but to also beat four straight opponents ranked in the AP top 10, in addition to beating AP ranked Iowa in the Round of 32, by an average victory margin of 19 points per game. Villanova's run included two of the ten most offensively efficient games in the analytics era (2002–present), beating Miami and Oklahoma by scoring 1.56 and 1.51 points per possession in the Sweet Sixteen and Final Four, respectively. It has been called perhaps the most dominant tournament championship run of all time, and the most dominant of the analytics era by a wide margin.

Previous season
The Wildcats finished the 2014–15 season 33–3, 16–2 in Big East play to win the Big East regular season championship. They defeated Marquette, Providence, and Xavier to become champions of the Big East tournament. They received the conference's automatic bid to the NCAA tournament as a No.1 seed where they defeated Lafayette in the Second Round before losing in the Third Round to NC State.

With their 31st win of the season, a 63–61 win over Providence in the semifinals of the Big East tournament, the Wildcats set a single season record for wins, which would eventually finish at 33.

Offseason

Departures

Incoming transfers

Incoming recruits

2017 recruiting class

Roster

Schedule and results

|-
!colspan=9 style="background:#013974; color:white;"| Exhibition

|-
!colspan=9 style="background:#013974; color:white;"| Regular season

|-
!colspan=9 style="background:#013974; color:white;"| Big East tournament

|-
!colspan=9 style="background:#013974; color:#white;"| NCAA tournament

Local Radio

Rankings

On February 8, the Wildcats became the first Villanova Wildcats men's basketball team to reach number one in the AP Poll.

*AP does not release post-NCAA tournament rankings

References

External links
2015–16 Villanova Wildcats men's basketball team at ESPN

Villanova Wildcats
Villanova Wildcats men's basketball seasons
Villanova
NCAA Division I men's basketball tournament Final Four seasons
NCAA Division I men's basketball tournament championship seasons